Hermann Ludwig von Balan (born 7 March 1812 in Berlin, died 16 March 1874 in Brussels) was a German diplomat who served as acting Foreign Secretary and head of the Foreign Office from 1872 to 1873.

A lawyer by profession, he joined the diplomatic service of the Kingdom of Prussia in 1833. He was appointed as Consul General in Warsaw in 1845, and as chargé d'affaires to the Free City of Frankfurt the following year. In 1848 he became chargé d'affaires to the Grand Duchy of Hesse. He became Envoy to the Kingdom of Württemberg in 1858, and was ennobled in 1859.

From 1859 to 1864, he was Envoy to the Kingdom of Denmark and took part in the negotiation of the 1864 Treaty of Vienna that concluded the Second Schleswig War. He served as Ambassador to Belgium from 1864 to 1871.

When he was succeeded by Bernhard Ernst von Bülow as Foreign Secretary, he was appointed to the Prussian House of Lords, where he was considered a liberal peer, and returned to his post as ambassador in Brussels. However, he died a few months later.

External links 
 Biographie in Meyers Konversationslexikon von 1885 bis 1892
 Biographie auf der Homepage des Bundesarchivs
 Adelige in der Gesetzlosen Gesellschaft Berlin 1809 bis 2000

1812 births
1874 deaths
Politicians from Berlin
Foreign Secretaries of Germany
Members of the Prussian House of Lords
Ambassadors of Germany to Belgium